Looker Studio, formerly Google Data Studio, is an online tool for converting data into customizable informative reports and dashboards introduced by Google on March 15, 2016 as part of the enterprise Google Analytics 360 suite. In May 2016, Google announced a free version of Data Studio for individuals and small teams.

Looker Studio is part of the Google Marketing Platform.

See also 
 
 Web analytics
 Data visualization

References

External links 
 

Web analytics
Web software